Coolgardie was an electoral district of the Legislative Assembly in the Australian state of Western Australia from 1897 to 1930.

The district was located in the Goldfields region, and was based in the town of Coolgardie. In 1898, it also included the settlements of Boorabbin, Bullabulling, Widgiemooltha, Londonderry, Siberia, Dunnsville, Bonnie Vale, and Kunanalling. Its first member was Alf Morgans who served briefly as Premier of Western Australia in late 1901. At the 1930 state election, the district was amalgamated with the neighbouring district of Yilgarn to form the new district of Yilgarn-Coolgardie.

Members for Coolgardie

Election results

References

Coolgardie
Electoral district
1897 establishments in Australia
Constituencies established in 1897
1930 disestablishments in Australia
Constituencies disestablished in 1930